Kentridge and Dumas in Conversation is a 2009 South African documentary biographical film written and directed by Catherine Meyburgh. It was jointly produced by Liza Essers and Jason Hoff.

The film centers on the real life stories of South African contemporary artists William Kentridge and Marlene Dumas who are also well known as popular artists in international contemporary art. The film shows them in discussion regarding drawing, painting and filmmaking. The film was screened at the 2009 Encounters Documentary Film Festival.

Cast 
 William Kentridge as himself
 Marlene Dumas as herself

References

External links 
 

2009 films
2009 documentary films
2000s biographical films
South African documentary films
South African biographical films
Biographical documentary films
2000s English-language films